Irene Jansen is a Dutch singer. She sang on the Ayreon album The Human Equation, portraying the character Passion. She was also the live backing vocalist of Star One during their tour in 2003, and played the character Morgana in two Gary Hughes concept albums. She was the lead singer of a power metal band called Karma. She made her first recordings in more than a decade for the Alarion album Waves of Destruction, released in 2016.

She is the younger sister of former After Forever and ReVamp, and current Nightwish singer Floor Jansen.

Discography

Alarion 
 Waves of Destruction (2016) – vocals

Ayreon 
 The Human Equation (2004) – vocals (Passion)
 "Day Eleven: Love" (single, 2004) – vocals (Passion)
 The Final Experiment (2005 re-release) – vocals (Merlin and the Knights in "Merlin's Will")
 The Theater Equation (live DVD, 2016) – vocals (Passion)
 Ayreon Universe – The Best of Ayreon Live (live DVD, 2018) – vocals, backing vocals

Freak Neil Inc. 
 Characters (2005) – vocals

Gary Hughes 
 Once and Future King Part I (2003)
 Once and Future King Part II (2003)

Karma 
 Demo (2003) – lead vocals

Northward 
 Northward (2018) – guest vocals

Mantra Vega 
 The Illusion's Reckoning (2016) – vocals

Star One 
 Live on Earth (live, 2003) – backing vocals
 Revel in Time (2022) — vocals on "Hand on the Clock (Alternate Version)", backing vocals

References 

Dutch heavy metal singers
Women heavy metal singers
Living people
1983 births
21st-century Dutch singers
21st-century Dutch women singers